Palais Royale (alternative titles Smoke Screen or Smokescreen) is a 1988 Canadian comedy film.

Plot
This dark crime comedy is set in 1959 where Gerald Price (Matt Craven) is a newcomer to Toronto. He competes with mobster Tony Dicarlo (Kim Coates) for the affections of Odessa Muldoon (Kim Cattrall). Meanwhile, Michael Dattalico (Dean Stockwell) is eager to expand his organized crime business in Toronto. Much of the action takes place in the art deco dance hall of the title, a historic building set on the shores of Lake Ontario.

Cast
 Kim Cattrall as Odessa Muldoon
 Matt Craven as Gerald Price
 Kim Coates as Tony Dicarlo
 Dean Stockwell as Michael Dattalico
 Henry Alessandroni as Dominic
 Victor Ertmanis as Sal
 David Fox as Bob
 Brian George as Gus
 Sean Hewitt as Mr. Gillis
 Michael Hogan as Sergeant Leonard
 Helen Hughes as Mrs. McDermott
 Sam Malkin as Sam
 Dee McCafferty as Officer Nichol
 Robin McCulloch as Rick
 Mario Romano as Joey

Release
The film premiered at the Toronto International Film Festival on 10 September 1988, then given a general Canadian release on 12 May 1989. The film was also released under the titles Smoke Screen or Smokescreen.

Reception 
'There is humour in Palais Royale, if you don't mind Toronto in-jokes.' – Paul Townend, Cinema Canada

References

External links
 

1988 films
Canadian crime comedy films
Films set in Toronto
English-language Canadian films
1980s English-language films
Films directed by Martin Lavut
1980s Canadian films
Canadian gangster films